Margaret Fiona Stuart (later Wall, 5 June 1934 – 10 September 1999) was a New Zealand sprinter. She competed in the women's 100 metres at the 1956 Summer Olympics.

References

1934 births
1999 deaths
Athletes (track and field) at the 1956 Summer Olympics
Athletes (track and field) at the 1958 British Empire and Commonwealth Games
New Zealand female sprinters
Olympic athletes of New Zealand
Sportspeople from Hastings, New Zealand
Commonwealth Games competitors for New Zealand
Olympic female sprinters
New Zealand female hurdlers